Bossiaea stephensonii is a species of flowering plant in the family Fabaceae and is endemic to near-coastal areas of New South Wales. It is a small, weakly erect, multi-stemmed shrub with sharply-pointed, mostly elliptic to egg-shaped leaves, and bright yellow and red flowers.

Description

Taxonomy
Bossiaeae stephensonii was first formally described in 1887 by Ferdinand von Mueller in Proceedings of the Linnean Society of New South Wales from specimens collected "near Wollongong" by the "erudite" "L. Stephenson, B.A.".

Distribution and habitat
This bossiaea grows in forest, woodland and heathland, often found on exposed, near-coastal sandstone, from Port Macquarie to the Illawarra region.

References

External links 
 The Australasian Virtual Herbarium – Bossiaea stephensonii occurrence data

stephensonii
Flora of New South Wales
Plants described in 1887
Taxa named by Ferdinand von Mueller